The Ryutin affair (1932) was one of the last attempts to oppose the General Secretary Joseph Stalin within the All-Union Communist Party (b).

Background 
Martemyan Ryutin was an Old Bolshevik and a secretary of the Moscow City Communist Party Committee in the 1920s. In December 1927 – September 1930, he was a candidate (non-voting) member of the Central Committee of the Soviet Communist Party and a supporter of the moderate ("Rightist") wing within the party led by the communist theoretician Nikolai Bukharin and Chairman  of the Council of People's Commissars Alexei Rykov.

When the latter were defeated and demoted by Stalin in 1928–1930, Ryutin was demoted as well. In September 1930 he was expelled from the Communist Party. Six weeks later, he was arrested for oppositionist views. He was released on 17 January 1931 and allowed to re-join the party, but remained silently opposed to Stalin's regime.

At the beginning of the 30s, against the backdrop of forced collectivization, widespread famine, and mass deportation, the opposition to the Stalinist course strengthened within the Communist Party of the Soviet Union. Opposition currents began to reappear, such as the underground organization of Ivan Smirnov and a group formed by Georgy Safarov and Nikolai Uglanov. Even new illegal entities started appearing, such as the group formed by Sergey Syrtsov and Vissarion Lominadze and another formed by Aleksandr Petrovich Smirnov, Nikolai Borisovich Eismont and Vladimir Tolmachyov.

The Union of Marxist-Leninists 
With Stalin now firmly in control of the Communist Party and all dissent punishable by immediate expulsion and exile, Ryutin decided to act in secret. In June 1932 he wrote a pamphlet entitled "Appeal to All Members of the All-Union Communist Party (bolsheviks)" and a nearly 200-page document entitled "Stalin and the Crisis of the Proletarian Dictatorship" (more commonly known as "Ryutin's Platform"). In these documents Ryutin called for an end to forced collectivization ("peace with the peasants"), a slowing down of the industrialization, the reinstatement of all previously expelled Party members on the left and on the right (including Leon Trotsky), and a "fresh start".

Four of the Platform's thirteen chapters examined the character of Stalin, whom Ryutin called "the gravedigger of the Revolution" and "the evil genius of the Party and the revolution". Ryutin's "Appeal" was even more inflammatory, arguing Stalin "must be removed by force" and urging its readers "to everywhere organize cells of the 'Union' to be joined under the banner of Leninism for the liquidation of the Stalin dictatorship".

Ryutin gathered around him a group of like-minded friends who called themselves "The Union of Marxist-Leninists". They began to distribute the "Appeal" to workers and to members of the opposition in the summer and early autumn of 1932. Nikolai Bukharin's former comrades, the "Red Professors" - Alexander Slepkov, Dmitri Maretsky, and Jan Sten - helped to distribute the manifestos. Sten gave copies to Lev Kamenev and to Grigory Zinoviev, while Slepkov provided the documents to a group of Trotskyists in Kharkov. 

Nearly all of the former leaders of the "Right Opposition" - Mikhail Tomsky, Nikolai Uglanov, and Alexei Rykov - saw the "Appeal". Benyamin Kayurov also aligned himself with the group. An informer soon betrayed the "Union" to the OGPU secret-police and to Stalin. On 23 September 1932 Ryutin was arrested along with other suspects.

On 27 September the Presidium of the Central Control Commission hastily convened to investigate and deal with the Ryutin group. Twenty-four members attended, including Yan Rudzutak, Yemelyan Yaroslavsky, Avel Yenukidze, Aaron Soltz, and Lenin's sister, Maria Ilyinichna Ulyanova. They authorized the OGPU "to uncover the still undetected members of Ryutin's counterrevolutionary group" and to acquaint "these white guard criminals...with the entire strictness of revolutionary law". The final report of the Presidium, released on October 9, expelled twenty-four people from the party and banished them from Moscow for varying lengths of time.  

The members of the "Union" were characterized as "degenerate elements who have become the enemies of communism and of Soviet power, as traitors to the party and the working class, who have tried to form an underground bourgeois-kulak organization under a fake 'Marxist-Leninist' banner for the purpose of restoring capitalism in general and kulakdom in particular in the USSR". The OGPU referred the matter of Ryutin's fate to the ruling Politburo.

Historical analysis 
A stenographic record of this Politburo meeting has not been located. A number of historians, led by Robert Conquest, have adopted the argument first advanced by Boris Nicolaevsky in "The Letter of an Old Bolshevik" (1936), that a division existed in the Politburo between moderates and hard-liners. Stalin argued that Ryutin deserved the death penalty, because his "Appeal" could inspire its readers to acts of terrorism and a palace coup. A moderate bloc of Politburo members opposed Stalin, because they were unwilling to violate Lenin's stricture against the spilling of Bolshevik blood. 

Sergei Kirov supposedly spoke with "particular force against the recourse to the death penalty" and was joined to a greater or lesser extent by Sergo Ordzhonikidze, Valerian Kuibyshev, Stanislav Kosior, and Yan Rudzutak, while Stalin's position was supported only by Lazar Kaganovich. According to historian J. Arch Getty, Nicolaevsky's story is a "persistent myth."  He points to an incident from eighteen months before when the Politburo voted for a very harsh penalty for the opposition and Stalin moderated the punishment.  It is known that Ryutin received the harshest penalty. He was sentenced to ten years imprisonment. 

Former United Opposition leaders Grigory Zinoviev and Lev Kamenev, who had read the Platform, were also expelled from the Communist Party in October 1932 and exiled to the Urals region for failure to report the incident to the secret police. Pierre Broué theorized that the Ryutin group was part of a larger anti-Stalin bloc formed in 1932, which Trotsky, Zinoviev, Kamenev and Smirnov were all members. Some of Trotsky's letters mention that some rightists were members of the bloc, none of which were named. As Ryutin and his allies were the only rightist group opposing Stalin at the time, they are the most likely to be those who Trotsky was mentioning. The bloc most likely dissolved in early 1933, when Ryutin and Smirnov were arrested.

Ryutin was eventually executed on 10 January 1937, during the Great Purge, which also claimed the lives of Bukharin, Zinoviev, Kamenev, Kosior, Rudzutak, Uglanov, Yenukidze, Rykov and most of the rest of the Old Bolsheviks.

References

1932 establishments in the Soviet Union
1932 disestablishments in the Soviet Union
History of the Communist Party of the Soviet Union
Political repression in the Soviet Union
Soviet internal politics
1932 in the Soviet Union
Factions in the Communist Party of the Soviet Union
Soviet opposition groups